The Turning Point Suffragist Memorial is monument to American suffragists. The memorial is located in Lorton, Virginia's Occoquan Regional Park and stands in close proximity to Occoquan Workhouse, a prison where 168 suffragists were once held during the 1910s Silent Sentinels demonstrations. 

The memorial opened in May of 2021.

See also 
Women's Suffrage National Monument

References 

National Memorials of the United States
Women's suffrage in the United States
NOVA Parks
2021 establishments in Virginia